The Special Honours are issued at the Queen's pleasure at any given time. The Special Honours refer the award of the Order of the Garter, Order of the Thistle, Order of Merit, Royal Victorian Order and the Order of St John.

† indicates an award given posthumously.

Life Peer

Conservative Party
 Sir Anthony Bamford, to be Baron Bamford of Daylesford in the County of Gloucestershire and of Wootton in the County of Staffordshire – 7 October 2013
 Annabel Goldie, to be Baroness Goldie of Bishopton in the County of Renfrewshire – 7 October 2013
 Susan Frances Maria Williams, to be Baroness Williams of Trafford of Hale in the County of Greater Manchester – 25 September 2013

Labour Party
 Sir Charles Lamb Allen, to be Baron Allen of Kensington of Kensington in the Royal Borough of Kensington and Chelsea – 4 October 2013

Liberal Democrat Party
 The Hon. James Palumbo, to be Baron Palumbo of Southwark of Southwark in the London Borough of Southwark – 4 October 2013
 Mike Storey, to be Baron Storey of Childwall in the City of Liverpool – 14 October 2013

Green Party of England and Wales
 Jennifer Helen Jones, to be Baroness Jones of Moulsecoomb of Moulsecoomb in the County of East Sussex – 25 September 2013

Crossbench
 The Rt Hon. Sir Roger John Laugharne Thomas, to be Baron Thomas of Cwmgiedd of Cwmgiedd in the County of Powys – 7 October 2013

Victoria Cross 

 Lance Corporal James Ashworth † – 22 March 2013

Most Noble Order of the Garter

Knight of the Order of the Garter (KG) 
 Air Chief Marshal The Rt. Hon. The Lord Stirrup  – 26 April 2013

Order of the Companions of Honour

Companion of the Order of the Companions of Honour (CH)
 The Rt. Hon. The Lord Strathclyde  – 1 March 2013

Knight Bachelor 
 The Hon. Mr Justice Thomas Mark Horner – 22 February 2013
 The Hon. Mr Justice George Andrew Midsomer Leggatt – 22 February 2013
 The Hon. Mr Justice Paul Richard Maguire – 22 February 2013
 The Hon. Mr Justice Stephen Martin Males – 22 February 2013
 The Hon. Mr Justice Jeremy Hugh Stuart-Smith – 22 February 2013
 The Hon. Mr Justice Jeremy Russell Baker
 The Hon. Mr Justice Colin Ian Birss
 The Hon. Mr Justice Stephen William Scott Cobb
 The Hon. Mr Justice Robert Maurice Jay
 The Hon. Mr Justice Michael Joseph Keehan
 The Hon. Mr Justice John Ailbe O'Hara
 The Hon. Mr Justice Stephen Paul Stewart
 The Hon. Mr Justice Mark George Turner
 The Rt. Hon. Greg Knight  -25 October 2013
 The Rt. Hon. John Randall  – 25 October 2013

Most Honourable Order of the Bath

Knight / Dame Grand Cross of the Order of the Bath (GCB) 
Honorary
 Park Geun-hye, President of the Republic of Korea

Most Distinguished Order of St Michael and St George

Knight / Dame Grand Cross of the Order of St Michael and St George (GCMG) 
 Cécile La Grenade , Governor-General of Grenada – 14 May 2013
 Edmund Lawrence , Governor-General of Saint Christopher and Nevis – 7 June 2013

Knight Commander of the Order of St Michael and St George (KCMG) 
Honorary
 Count Jacques Rogge, For services to the London 2012 Olympic Games and British and international sport
 His Highness Abdullah bin Zayed Al Nahyan of the United Arab Emirates, Minister of Foreign Affairs 
 Yun Byung-se, Minister of Foreign Affairs

Companion of the Order of St Michael and St George (CMG) 
Honorary
 Dr Anwar Mohammed Gargash, Minister of State for Foreign Affairs

Royal Victorian Chain 
 The Most Rev. and Rt. Hon. Rowan Williams , retired Archbishop of Canterbury – 15 January 2013

The Royal Victorian Order

Dame Commander of the Royal Victorian Order (DCVO) 
 The Honourable Priscilla Jane Stephanie, Lady Roberts , on retirement as Librarian and Curator of the Print Room, Windsor Castle – 30 July 2013

Knight Commander of the Royal Victorian Order (KCVO) 
 Nigel McCulloch, on retirement as Lord High Almoner – 8 March 2013
 Major General George Norton , on relinquishing the appointment of Major General Commanding the Household Division – 12 July 2013
 John Cairns, on retirement as Dean of the Chapel Royal in Scotland – 12 July 2013
 Paul Robert Virgo Clarke , on retirement as Clerk of the Council, Duchy of Lancaster – 30 July 2013
Honorary
 His Excellency Lim Sung-nam, Ambassador to the United Kingdom of Great Britain and Northern Ireland

Commander of the Royal Victorian Order (CVO) 
Honorary
 Abdul Rahman Ghanem Al Mutaiwee, UAE Ambassador to the United Kingdom 
 Chul-ki, Senior Secretary to the President for Foreign Affairs and National Security 
 Cho Won-dong, Senior Secretary to the President for Economic Affairs  
 Lee Jung-hyun, Senior Secretary to the President for Public Relations

Lieutenant of the Royal Victorian Order (LVO) 
 Richard Frederick Griffin , For services to Royalty Protection – 5 April 2013
 Robert Andrew Ball , on retirement as Senior Horological Conservator, Royal Household – 9 April 2013
 Alan Peter Ryan , on retirement as Assistant Property Manager, Buckingham Palace – 30 July 2013
 John Charles Rodger Gray , On the relinquishment of his appointment as Marshal of the Diplomatic Corps – 17 December 2013

Honorary
 Kim Hyoung-zhin, Secretary to the President for Foreign Affairs (honorary) 
 Amb Choe Jong-hyun, Deputy Minister for Protocol Affairs (Chief of Protocol) (honorary)  
 Ha Tae-Youk, Director-General for European Affairs, Ministry of Foreign Affairs (honorary)  
 Seokhee Kang, Counsellor, South Korean Embassy, London (honorary)

Member of the Royal Victorian Order (MVO) 
 Joseph Geoffrey Last , on retirement as Head Chauffeur, Royal Household – 22 February 2013
 Captain Devendra Ale, The Queen's Own Gurkha Logistic Regiment – on relinquishment of his appointment as Queen's Gurkha Orderly Officer – 26 July 2013
 Captain Trilochan Hurung, The Royal Gurkha Rifles – on relinquishment of his appointment as Queen's Gurkha Orderly Officer – 26 July 2013
 Daniel Martell , on retirement as Deputy Head Chauffeur, Royal Household – 30 July 2013
 Squadron Leader Dale Alexander White, On relinquishment of his appointment as Equerry to The Duke of Edinburgh – 18 October 2013
 Michael Robert Sykes , On retirement as Chief Carpet Planner, Royal Household – 15 November 2013

Honorary
 Hyon Du Kim, First Secretary, South Korean Embassy, London

Royal Victorian Medal (RVM)

Royal Victorian Medal (Silver) & Bar 
 Elizabeth Maud Wilkinson , on retirement as Groom, the Royal Studs, Hampton Court – 12 March 2013
 Janet Margaret Doel , on retirement as The Queen's Housemaid, Windsor Castle – 12 March 2013
 Keith Andrew Rembridge , On retirement as Telegraph Clerk, Court Post Office, Buckingham Palace – 30 July 2013

Royal Victorian Medal (Gold) 
 Patrick Joseph Carroll , For services as a State Porter, Royal Household – 31 May 2013
 John Trodden Kerr , On retirement as Leading Palace Attendant, Windsor Castle – 30 July 2013
 Keith Howard GRIFFITHS , On retirement as Courier, Royal Household – 17 December 2013

Royal Victorian Medal (Silver) 
 Warrant Officer Class 1 Derek William James Potter, The Royal Scots Dragoon Guards, on relinquishment of his appointment as The Queen's Piper – 11 January 2013

Most Excellent Order of the British Empire

Dame Commander of the Order of the British Empire (DBE) 
 The Hon. Mrs. Justice Sarah Jane Asplin – 5 March 2013
 The Hon. Mrs. Justice Janice Mesadis Pereira, Chief Justice of the Eastern Caribbean Supreme Court – 7 May 2013
 The Hon. Mrs. Justice Vivien Judith Rose – 22 October 2013

Honorary
 Angela Ahrendts, For services to business
 Melinda Gates, For services to philanthropy and international development

Knight Commander of the Order of the British Empire (KBE) 
Honorary
 Hisashi Hieda, For services to UK/Japan cultural and media relations
 Richard Lugar, For services to UK-US defence relations and international security
 Minoru Makihara, For services to UK/Japan business and trade relations
 His Highness Mansour bin Zayed Al Nahyan, Deputy Prime Minister, Minister of Presidential Affairs
 His Highness Hamed bin Zayed Al Nahyan, Chairman of the Abu Dhabi Crown Prince's Court
 His Highness Ahmed bin Saeed Al Maktoum, President of the Department of Civil Aviation
 Her Excellency Lubna bint Khaled Al Qasimi, Minister of International Cooperation and Development 
 Choi Mun-kee, Minister of Science, ICT and Future Planning 
 Yoon Sang-jick, Minister of Trade, Industry and Energy

Commander of the Order of the British Empire (CBE) 
Honorary
 Camila Batmanghelidjh, For services to children and young people
 His Grace The Duke of Rohan, For services to UK/French relations
 Jacques Gounon, For services to UK transport
 Duncan L. Niederauer, For services to the Northern Ireland economy
 Jin Park, For services to strengthening UK/Republic of Korea bilateral relations
 Adam Simon Posen, For services to the economy
 Antoine Jan Macgiel Valk, For services to British public transport and strengthening the Anglo-Dutch Commercial relationship
 Hans Wijers, For services to British industry
 Ahmed Juma Al Zaabi, Deputy Minister of Presidential Affairs
 Khaldoon Khalifa Al Mubarak, Chairman of the Abu Dhabi Executive Affairs Authority 
 Zaki Anwar Nusseibeh, Adviser, Ministry of Presidential Affairs 
 Dr Sultan Ahmed Sultan al Jaber, Minister of State and member of the Cabinet 
 Major General Essa Saif Mohammed Al Mazrouei, Deputy Chief of Staff, UAE Armed Forces

Officer of the Order of the British Empire (OBE) 

Military division
 Commander Nicholas Geoffrey Dunn, RN – 8 January 2013

Honorary
 General Luis Alejandre Sintes, For services to British/Spanish relations and cultural ties
 Hoda Ibrahim Alkhamis-Kanoo, For services to arts and cultural exchange between the UK and UAE
 Khalid Rashid Shaikh Abdulrahman Al Zayani, For services to UK business overseas and UK/Bahraini relations
 Douglas Burns Arnot, For services to the London 2012 Olympic and Paralympic Games
 Michel Claude Joseph Dubarry, For services to the promotion of Rolls-Royce and wider UK interests in France
 Professor David Frank Ford, For services to theological scholarship and inter-faith relations
 Ehab Abdalla Attia Gaddis, For services to the British community and British Embassy in Egypt
 Professor Eileen Harkin-Jones, For services to higher education in Northern Ireland
 Doctor Eva Henriëtte Reina Renée Lloyd-Reichling, For services to education
 Malachy Stephen McAleer, For services to education and young people in Northern Ireland
 Professor Andrea Mary Nolan, For services to veterinary science and higher education
 Judith L O’Rourke, For services to the communities of Syracuse and Lockerbie following the attack on Pan Am 103 in 1988
 Shunichi Sugioka, For services to UK relations in the fields of commerce and cultural exchange
 Mario Eduardo Testino, For services to photography and charity
 Jean-Paul Pierre Villain, For services to British education and inward investment to the UK
 Susan Janet Wade, For services to criminal justice reform and to the community in Winchester, Hampshire

Member of the Order of the British Empire (MBE) 
Honorary
 Walid Mohmed Al Fagih, For services to the British Embassy, Tripoli
 Farouk Al Najah, For services to the British Embassy, Tripoli 
 Shaker Mohamed Ben Milad, For services to the British Embassy, Tripoli 
 Stéphane Bern, For services to UK/French cultural relations 
 Maria Magdalena Cremaschi, For services to the arts and UK/Spain cultural relations 
 Professor Keith Scott Delaplane, For services to beekeeping 
 Mary Teresa Doherty, For services to the Labour Party and to the community in Dulwich, London Borough of Southwark 
 Desiree Allison Downes, For services to legislative drafting in the Turks and Caicos Islands 
 Natalie du Toit, For services to Paralympic sport 
 Michel Euxibie, For services to UK/France relations and British veterans 
 Doctor Anna Gedeon, For services to the British Embassy in Hungary 
 Sandra Joan Hamilton, For services to cancer sufferers 
 Tuan Jainudeen Ishak Ismail, For services to protecting British interests in Sri Lanka 
 Gareth Paul Mc Callion, For services to the London 2012 Olympic and Paralympic Games 
 Shari Lynn McGraw, For services to British interests in the USA 
 Antonio Millozzi, For services to charity 
 Clarence Hendry October, For services to the community of Tristan de Cunha 
 June Antoinette O’Sullivan, For services to young people in London 
 Bernadette Edel Porter. For services to nursing 
 Pedro Antonio Serra Bauza, For services to the local British resident community in Mallorca, Spain 
 Hassen Amer Shebani, For services to the British Embassy, Tripoli 
 Eileen Mary Strevens, For services to the rights of disabled children and children with special educational needs 
 Brian Neville Tarpey, For services to British war graves in Malta 
 Dijana Zrilic, For services to UK/Croatia defence relations
 Jamal Ahmed Al Muhairi, Presidential Protocol

British Empire Medal 
Honorary
 Senor Jacques Jean Pierre Coudry, For services to the British interests in Brazil
 Jawaahir Daahir, For services to the Somali community in Leicester
 Titus Anno Sjoerd Vogt, For services to the community in Faringdon, Oxfordshire

Order of St John

Bailiff / Dame Grand Cross of the Order of St John 
 Professor Jonathan Simon Christopher Riley-Smith
 Judith Ann Hoban
 Stuart James Shilson

Knight / Dame of the Order of St John 
 Alderman Michael Roger Gifford
 Lawson Rennie
 Ian William John Wallace
 Willem van der Westhuizen Louw
 Tessa Elnora, Mrs van Antwerpen
 Professor Beverley Joy Wilson
 Elliott Belgrave , Governor-General of Barbados
 Chen Sze Hua
 Lim Chye Huat
 Brigadier-General Epeli Nailatikau CF  CSM MSD, President of Fiji
 Royston Clive Rooke
 Mark Sean Sisk
 Patricia Staples Horne Dresser
 Victoria Mary Sheffield
 Richard Denis Blundell
 Paul Ndiritu Ndungu
 Ian John Rae
 Andries William de Villiers
 Rex Bertie Wheeler
 Colonel Kevin Thomas Williams, SD SM 
 Peter Damian Wood
 Shirley Marion Hennessy
 Jillian, Mrs Mludek
 Rear Admiral Frederick Brian Goodson 
 Peter John Field
 William Arthur Spence
 Susan Elizabeth Pyper
 Alderman Mrs Fiona Catherine Woolfe

References 

2013 in the United Kingdom
2013 awards in the United Kingdom
British honours system